The Nebraska Cornhuskers (often abbreviated to Huskers) are the intercollegiate athletic teams that represent the University of Nebraska–Lincoln. The university is a member of the Big Ten Conference, and the Cornhuskers compete in NCAA Division I, fielding twenty-two varsity teams (nine men's, thirteen women's) in fifteen sports. Nineteen of these teams participate in the Big Ten, while rifle is a member of the single-sport Patriot Rifle Conference and beach volleyball and bowling compete as independents. The Cornhuskers have two official mascots, Herbie Husker and Lil' Red.

Early nicknames for the university's athletic teams included the Antelopes (later adopted by the University of Nebraska at Kearney), the Old Gold Knights, the Bugeaters, and the Mankilling Mastodons. Cornhuskers first appeared in a school newspaper headline ("We Have Met The Cornhuskers And They Are Ours"), after a 20–18 upset victory over Iowa in 1893. In this instance, Cornhuskers was used to refer to Iowa. The term was first applied to Nebraska in 1899 by Nebraska State Journal writer Cy Sherman, who would later help originate the AP Poll. The next year, the nickname was officially adopted by the school.

For nearly one hundred years, the Cornhuskers participated in the Big Eight Conference (previously known as the Missouri Valley Intercollegiate Athletic Association, the Big Six, and the Big Seven), and later for fifteen years in the Big 12 Conference, which was formed when the Big Eight merged with four members of the defunct Southwest Conference. Nebraska joined the Big Ten in 2011.

Nebraska's athletic programs have won twenty-nine national championships: eight in men's gymnastics and bowling, five in football and volleyball, and three in women's track and field.

Fall varsity sports

Cross country
Nebraska's men's cross country team was established in 1938, winning its only conference championship just two years later. The women's program was established in 1975 to help satisfy Title IX requirements. Matt Wackerly has coached both teams since 2021, when he succeeded longtime coach David Harris.

Men
Conference championships (1): 1940
NCAA Championship appearances (23): 1962, 1969–71, 1983–90, 1992, 1994–97, 2000–02, 2010, 2018, 2019
Women
Conference championships (5): 1985, 1988, 1989, 1991, 1993
NCAA Championship appearances (26): 1975, 1977, 1978, 1980, 1984, 1986–99, 2001, 2003, 2005, 2007–10

Football

Nebraska's football team competes as part of the NCAA Division I Football Bowl Subdivision in the Big Ten's West Division. Nebraska plays its home games at Memorial Stadium, where it has sold out every game since 1962. The team has been coached by Scott Frost since 2018.

Nebraska is among the most storied programs in college football history. NU claims forty-six conference championships and five national championships (1970, 1971, 1994, 1995, and 1997), and has won nine other national championships the school does not claim. NU's 1971 and 1995 title-winning teams are considered to be among the best in college football history. Heisman Trophy winners Johnny Rodgers, Mike Rozier, and Eric Crouch join twenty-two other Cornhuskers in the College Football Hall of Fame.

The program's first extended period of success came just after the turn of the century. Between 1900 and 1916, Nebraska had five undefeated seasons and completed a stretch of thirty-four consecutive games without a loss, still a program record. Despite a span of twenty-one conference championships in thirty-three seasons, the Cornhuskers didn't experience major national success until Bob Devaney was hired in 1962. In eleven seasons as head coach, Devaney won two national championships, eight conference titles, and coached twenty-two All-Americans, but perhaps his most lasting achievement was the hiring of Tom Osborne as offensive coordinator in 1969. Osborne was named Devaney's successor in 1973, and over the next twenty-five years established himself as one of the best coaches in college football history with his trademark I-form offense and revolutionary strength, conditioning, and nutrition programs. Following Osborne's retirement in 1997, Nebraska cycled through four head coaches before hiring state native Scott Frost in 2017.

Conference championships (46): 1894, 1895, 1897, 1907, 1910–17, 1921–23, 1928, 1929, 1931–33, 1935–37, 1940, 1963–66, 1969–72, 1975, 1978, 1981–84, 1988, 1991–95, 1997, 1999
Division championships (10): 1996, 1997, 1999–2001, 2006, 2008–10, 2012
National championships (claimed in bold) (14): 1915, 1921, 1970, 1971, 1980–84, 1993, 1994, 1995, 1997, 1999

Soccer

In 1995, Nebraska became the first Big Eight school to sponsor a varsity women's soccer program. John Walker was hired lead the new program and took his team to the NCAA Championship in his third year, the first of eight consecutive tournament appearances. However, since this streak ended in 2005 the Cornhuskers have reached the tournament just twice. The team has reached the round of 16 eight times and the national quarterfinals twice. Walker has earned NSCAA National Coach of the Year, NSCAA Central Region Coach of the Year and Big 12 Conference Coach of the Year during his tenure in Lincoln.

Conference championships (4): 1996, 1999, 2000, 2013
Conference tournament championships (7): 1996, 1998–2000, 2002, 2013
NCAA Championship appearances (12): 1996–2005, 2013, 2016

Volleyball

Nebraska's volleyball program is among the best in the history of the sport. The Cornhuskers have won five national championships (1995, 2000, 2006, 2015, 2017) and reached the national semifinals on ten other occasions. NU has won more games than any other program, and ranks second in national semifinal appearances, tournament wins, and tournament winning percentage. Nebraska has made the NCAA tournament for thirty-nine consecutive seasons and has never been ranked outside of the national top 20. The Cornhuskers have featured more AVCA All-Americans than any other program, including four National Player of the Year award winners.

Nebraska volleyball is one of the most popular spectator attractions in the state. In 2008, AVCA executive director Kathy DeBoer described Nebraska as "the epicenter of volleyball fandom." The Cornhuskers have led the country in attendance every year since moving to the Devaney Center in 2013 and have sold out over 250 consecutive home matches, an NCAA record for any women's sport. Before moving to the larger Devaney Center, Nebraska played at the historic NU Coliseum; while playing there, the Cornhuskers had fifteen undefeated seasons at home and a record of 454–30. From 2005 to 2009, Nebraska won a then-NCAA-record ninety consecutive home matches.

The Cornhuskers have played in several of the highest-attended games in NCAA history, including the 2017 national championship game, when 18,516 fans watched Nebraska defeat Florida at the Sprint Center in Kansas City. This broke the all-time record set just two days before, when Nebraska beat Penn State in the national semifinals.

Conference championships (34): 1976–92, 1994–96, 1998–2002, 2004–08, 2010, 2011, 2016, 2017
Conference tournament championships (Big Eight only) (18): 1976–86, 1988–91, 1993–95
AIAW (7) / NCAA (39) Tournament appearances: 1975–81, 1983–2021
NCAA Tournament national semifinals (16): 1986, 1989, 1990, 1995, 1996, 1998, 2000, 2001, 2005, 2006, 2008, 2015–18, 2021
NCAA Tournament championships (5): 1995, 2000, 2006, 2015, 2017

Winter varsity sports

Basketball
Men

While many of the University of Nebraska's athletic programs have seen continued success, NU's men's basketball program has accomplished little of note since the establishment of the NCAA tournament in 1939. Nebraska has not won a conference championship since sharing the Big Seven title with Kansas and Kansas State in 1950, and has not won an outright title since going a perfect 12–0 in the MVIAA in 1916. Nebraska's lengthiest period of success came in the first years of the sport's existence; the retroactive Premo-Porretta Power Poll ranked the Cornhuskers in the top ten three times between 1897 and 1903.

Nebraska is the only power conference program without a victory in the NCAA Tournament; NU did not even make the tournament until 1986, forty-six years after its establishment. Much of the team's modest tournament success came under Danny Nee, who coached the Huskers from 1987 to 2000. Nee is the team's all-time winningest head coach and led Nebraska to five of its seven NCAA Tournament appearances, the 1996 NIT championship, and its only conference championship of any kind since 1950 (the 1994 Big Eight tournament).

After the departure of Nee, Nebraska did not make the tournament again until 2014. Under the leadership of Tim Miles, NU appeared in the preseason top 25 for the first time in two decades in 2015, but failed to return to the tournament across the rest of Miles' tenure. Shortly after the conclusion of Nebraska's 2018–19 season, Miles was fired, and Nebraska hired former Chicago Bulls head coach Fred Hoiberg.

Conference championships (6): 1912–14, 1916, 1949, 1950
Conference tournament championships (1): 1994
NCAA Tournament appearances (7): 1986, 1991–94, 1998, 2014
NIT appearances (19): 1967, 1978, 1980, 1983–85, 1987, 1989, 1995–97, 1999, 2004, 2006, 2008, 2009, 2011, 2018, 2019
NIT championships (1): 1996

Women

Nebraska's women's basketball program started as a club sport in 1970 and became a varsity sport five years later. George Nicodemus led the Huskers to a 22–9 record and the second round of the AIAW Tournament in its first varsity season. Nicodemus left the program in 1977, and the school cycled through several head coaches before hiring Angela Beck in 1986. Beck led the Huskers to the Big Eight championship and the school's first NCAA tournament appearance in 1988. She took the Huskers back to the NCAA Tournament in 1993 and 1996 before leaving the program in 1997. Beck's replacement was Paul Sanderford, who led Nebraska to the tournament in each of his first three seasons. When Sanderford resigned in 2002 due to health issues, the school hired Creighton head coach Connie Yori.

Under Yori's guidance, Nebraska became a fixture in the national top 25 and NCAA Tournament. In 2010 the Cornhuskers went 32-2, earned a number one seed in the NCAA Tournament, and reached the Sweet Sixteen for the first time in school history. Yori resigned in 2016 after a university investigation concluded she had mistreated her players and assistant coaches. Former Huskers point guard Amy Williams was named Yori's replacement.

Conference championships (2): 1988, 2010
Conference tournament championships (1): 2014
AIAW (3) / NCAA (16) Tournament appearances: 1979–81, 1988, 1993, 1996, 1998–2000, 2007, 2008, 2010, 2012–15, 2022
WNIT appearances (7): 1976, 1992, 2004–06, 2009, 2016

Bowling

Bowling has been an official varsity sport at Nebraska since 1996. Bill Straub, who led the bowling club program to national championships in 1991 and 1995, was hired to lead the varsity program and won three more WIBC titles. The inaugural NCAA Bowling Championship was held in 2003 and Nebraska won the first two national titles. Nebraska has won four more titles since, and has never been ranked outside the top ten since national collegiate rankings debuted in 1990. In 2019, Straub retired and longtime assistant Paul Klempa was named head coach.

Nebraska's men's bowling team won the ABC intercollegiate championships in 1990 and 1996.

Bowling competes as an independent, making it one of only three programs at Nebraska not affiliated with the Big Ten.

WIBC (13) / NCAA (18) Tournament appearances: 1991–2019, 2021, 2022
WIBC (5) / NCAA (6) national championships: 1991, 1995, 1997, 1999, 2001, 2004, 2005, 2009, 2013, 2015, 2021

Gymnastics
Men

Nebraska's men's gymnastics program is one of the most successful in the nation, with eight team national championships and forty-one NCAA event titles. Ten Huskers have represented the United States in the Olympics. Nebraska is one of only five Big Ten schools to sanction a men's gymnastics program.

Individual all-around national championships (9): Jim Hartung (1980, 1981), Wes Suter (1985), Tom Schlesinger (1987), Kevin Davis (1988), Patrick Kirksey (1989), Dennis Harrison (1994), Richard Grace (1995), Jason Hardabura (1999)

Conference championships (15): 1964, 1976, 1980, 1982, 1983, 1985, 1986, 1988–90, 1992–94, 1997, 1999
NCAA Championship appearances (27): 1975, 1976, 1979–99, 2017–19, 2021
NCAA championships (8): 1979–83, 1988, 1990, 1994

Women

Nebraska's women's gymnastics program was established in 1975. The school's first team, led by head coach Karen Balke, was made up entirely of freshmen and sophomores. Judy Schalk replaced Balke after two seasons and led the Huskers to five conference titles and a national tournament bid. Rick Walton replaced Schalk and gave the school its first NCAA event title when Michele Bryant won the vault in 1990. He captured four straight Big Eight championships, each resulting in an NCAA Tournament appearance. Dan Kendig was named head coach in 1993 and was named Big Eight Coach of the Year after leading NU to the conference title. In 1997, Nebraska upset No. 1 Utah to reach the Super Six Finals for the first time in school history. Kendig won his sixth consecutive conference championship in 1999 and was named national coach of the year. Kendig's teams won four individual event titles; Heather Brink won the all-around and vault in 2000 and Richelle Simpson won the all-around and floor exercise in 2003. Brink was named Kendig's replacement in 2019 when he resigned in the midst of an NCAA investigation.

Individual all-around national championships (2): Heather Brink (2000), Richelle Simpson (2003)

Conference championships (1): 2014
Conference meet championships (23): 1978–80, 1982, 1983, 1987–90, 1994–99, 2001–03, 2005, 2007, 2011–13
NCAA Championship appearances (23) 1982, 1983, 1987–90, 1995–97, 1999–2007, 2010–12, 2014, 2015

Rifle

Rifle became an official sport at the university in 1998. The team practices and hosts meets at the ten-point indoor firing range in NU's Military and Naval Sciences Building (ROTC). The team has been coached by Mindy Miles since 2021.

Although rifle is classified as a coeducational sport by the NCAA, Nebraska fields an all-female team. The program competed as an independent for six years before joining the Great America Rifle Conference in 2004. NU left the GARC for the Patriot Rifle Conference in 2021, making it one of only three programs at Nebraska not affiliated with the Big Ten.

Conference championships (1): 2006
Conference tournament championships (2): 2005, 2006
NCAA Championship appearances (16): 2000, 2001, 2004–08, 2010, 2013–18, 2020, 2021

Track and field
Men

Nebraska's men's track and field team started in 1922 under coach Henry Schulte, who led the Huskers to nine conference titles before his retirement. His assistant, College Football Hall of Famer Ed Weir, replaced Schulte. Shortly after Weir retired to work as an athletic administrator in 1955, Frank Sevigne was hired to lead the program. Under Sevigne, the Huskers won eleven individual national championships, with forty-two All-American selections and 103 individual conference champions in combined indoor and outdoor events. Gary Pepin has coached the men's and women's teams since Sevigne's retirement in 1983.

Indoor conference championships (37): 1930–33, 1936–38, 1940–42, 1949, 1951, 1963, 1972, 1973, 1978, 1985, 1987–89, 1992, 1994–98, 2000–05, 2007, 2015, 2016

Outdoor conference championships (29): 1921–24, 1926, 1929, 1932, 1933, 1936, 1937, 1939–42, 1950, 1966, 1987, 1989, 1990, 1995, 1996, 1998, 2000, 2002, 2004, 2009, 2010, 2013, 2016

Women

Nebraska's women's track and field program was created during the 1975–76 academic year and began competition in 1976. The team's first head coach was Roger Capan, but he left after only one season and was replaced by Carol Frost, whose son Scott would later quarterback the Cornhuskers to a national championship in 1997. Frost left Nebraska after the 1980 season, and Gary Pepin took over the program. Two years later Pepin assumed control of the men's program as well, a dual role he still holds.

Indoor conference championships (24): 1980–97, 2000, 2001, 2004, 2005, 2011, 2012
Indoor AIAW (1) / NCAA (2) national championships: 1982–84

Outdoor conference championships (18): 1980–95, 2000, 2005

Wrestling

Nebraska's wrestling program started in 1910 under the guidance of head coach R.G. Clapp. Despite modest success in the program's early years, NU has been a mainstay in the national top ten since Tim Neumann was hired in 1985. Mark Manning has led the Huskers since 2000 and twice won conference coach of the year. Former Nebraska standouts include 2000 Olympic gold medalist and 2004 bronze medalist Rulon Gardner, and two-time NCAA champion and 2012 Olympic gold medalist Jordan Burroughs.

Individual

National championships (11): Mike Nissen (1963 – 123 lbs), Jim Scherr (1984 – 177 lbs), Bill Scherr (1984 – 190 lbs), Jason Kelber (1991 – 126 lbs), Tony Purler (1993 – 126 lbs), Tolly Thompson (1995 – HWT), Brad Vering (2000 – 197 lbs), Jason Powell (2004 – 125 lbs), Paul Donahoe (2007 – 125 lbs), Jordan Burroughs (2009 – 157 lbs; 2011 – 165 lbs)

Team

NCAA Championship appearances (54): 1928, 1942, 1946, 1949, 1954, 1958, 1959, 1961–63, 1973, 1975, 1978, 1980–2019, 2021
Conference championships (7): 1911, 1915, 1924, 1949, 1993, 1995, 2009

Spring varsity sports

Baseball

Nebraska's baseball program was founded in 1889, making it the oldest athletic program at the school. The Cornhuskers experienced little success for most of the program's history, making the NCAA tournament just three times in the forty-five years following its creation in 1954. Dave Van Horn, hired in 1998, quickly turned NU into a national power. Nebraska won its first conference tournament in Van Horn's second season, and in 2000 advanced to a super regional for the first time. The Cornhuskers reached the College World Series, held annually in nearby Omaha, in each of the following two seasons, but failed to win a game in either appearance. Van Horn compiled a 214–92 record during his five-year tenure, but left NU following the 2002 season to coach at Arkansas, his alma mater. Former Van Horn assistant Mike Anderson led Nebraska back to the College World Series in 2005, winning a school-record fifty-seven games. Darin Erstad replaced Anderson in 2011, but won just one conference title in eight years before retiring. In 2020, NU hired Texas A&M assistant Will Bolt to lead the program.

In 2002, the Huskers moved from the aging Buck Beltzer Stadium to Hawks Field at Haymarket Park, considered among the best collegiate baseball facilities in the country. Nebraska has ranked in the top thirty nationally in average attendance every year since the move to Hawks Field.

Conference championships (8): 1929, 1948, 1950, 2001, 2003, 2005, 2017, 2021
Conference tournament championships (4): 1999–2001, 2005
NCAA District (2) / NCAA Tournament (17) appearances: 1948, 1950, 1979, 1980, 1985, 1999–2003, 2005–08, 2014, 2016, 2017, 2019, 2021
College World Series appearances (3): 2001, 2002, 2005

Beach volleyball

In 2013, Nebraska announced it would add beach volleyball as the school's twenty-second intercollegiate varsity sport, and the program began play that spring. In 2016, the NCAA began sponsoring a beach volleyball tournament (previously the sport was run by the AVCA), but Nebraska did not attempt to qualify. Despite the sport's increasing popularity (sixty-four teams now compete in Division I), Nebraska runs one of the only beach volleyball programs in the Midwest, and generally plays the bulk of its season during a spring break trip to California and Hawaii. Nebraska's beach roster is made up entirely of players from its indoor program, and head coach John Cook has said the school views beach volleyball primarily as a training and recruiting tool for its indoor team.

On March 8, 2017, Nebraska hosted Missouri Baptist at the Hawks Championship Center. The match was closed to the public due to space limitations, but was noteworthy as the first collegiate beach volleyball match to take place in the state of Nebraska. The Cornhuskers swept the Spartans 5–0.

Beach volleyball competes as an independent, making it one of only three programs at Nebraska not affiliated with the Big Ten.

In 2007, Jordan Larson and Sarah Pavan defeated student-athletes from seven other schools to win the Collegiate Beach Volleyball Championship, an invitational tournament featuring two players per school.

Golf
Men

Nebraska's golf program began in 1935, led by College Football Hall of Fame coach Dana X. Bible. The team's greatest successes came under longtime head coach Larry Romjue, who took NU to all four of its NCAA Championship appearances. The program has been coached by Brett Balak since 2021.

Conference championships (2): 1936, 1937
NCAA Championship appearance (4): 1973, 1978, 1998, 1999

Women

NU established a women's golf program in 1975, initially under the leadership of men's coach Larry Romjue. In 1979, Nebraska hired its first coach exclusively to coach women's golf. The Cornhuskers have made the NCAA Championship three times. The program is currently coached by Lisa Johnson.

Conference championships (2): 1976, 1983
NCAA Championship appearance (3): 2000, 2003, 2006

Softball

Nebraska's softball program started in 1970, before it was an official NCAA sport. Since the NCAA sanctioned softball in 1983, the Cornhuskers have made eight appearances in the Women's College World Series, held annually in Oklahoma City, and won the tenth-most games of any program. The program's greatest successes came under head coach Wayne Daigle shortly after the tournament's creation, culminating in a national runner-up finish in 1985 (though it was quickly vacated by the NCAA Committee on Infractions). Rhonda Revelle became the program's head coach in 1992, and has since won more games than any coach in Nebraska athletics history. Revelle has won seven conference titles and was inducted into the National Fastpitch Coaches Association Hall of Fame in 2010.

Conference championships (10): 1982, 1984–88, 1998, 2001, 2004, 2014
Conference tournament championships (9): 1982, 1984–88, 1998, 2000, 2004
NCAA Tournament appearances (25): 1982, 1984, 1985, 1987, 1988, 1995–2007, 2009–11, 2013–16
Women's College World Series appearances (8): 1982, 1984, 1985, 1987, 1988, 1998, 2002, 2013

Tennis
Men

Nebraska's men's tennis team was established in 1928 and has made the NCAA Championship twice, most recently in 2011. Five Cornhuskers have won conference championships, and seventeen have been named all-conference selections. In 1989, Steven Jung was the NCAA Singles runner-up and was named NU's first All-American. Jung is the only men's tennis player in the Nebraska Athletic Hall of Fame.

NU made its only two NCAA appearances under Kerry McDermott, who led the program for thirty-seven years. Following the 2018 Big Ten tournament, Nebraska announced McDermott would not return and hired Sean Maymi as his replacement.

NCAA Championship appearance (2): 2010, 2011

Women

NU's women's tennis program was established in 1976 and has made the NCAA Championship six times since 2000, most recently in 2013. Fourteen Cornhuskers have won conference championships, and twenty have been named all-conference selections. The team has been coached by Scott Jacobson since 1992.

NCAA Championship appearance (6): 2005, 2006, 2010–13
Conference championships (4): 1977, 1978, 2013, 2020

Club sports

The University of Nebraska–Lincoln sponsors club programs in badminton, barbell, baseball, bowling, broomball, climbing, crew, curling, cycling, dodgeball, golf, men's hockey, women's hockey, judo, men's lacrosse, women's lacrosse, rifle, men's rugby, women's rugby, runners, men's soccer, women's soccer, softball, sport officials, swim, table tennis, taekwondo, tennis, men's ultimate Frisbee, women's ultimate Frisbee, men's volleyball, women's volleyball, water polo, and water ski.

Athletic directors

In its earliest days, the Nebraska Department of Athletics had no central figure serving as the head of the department, and the history of how this position developed is unclear. Early on, the head of the athletics department often had only a partial or part-time role and held other titles and responsibilities. The first six heads of the Athletics Department held the title "Athletics Manager," first held by Raymond G. Clapp, NU's basketball coach and a professor of physical education. The first individual to hold the title "athletic director" was E. J. Stewart, who served from 1916 to 1919, while also coaching men's basketball and football during parts of his tenure. However, he is not considered Nebraska's first athletic director because it was not considered a full-time administrative position by the Board of Regents; this designation belong to Fred Luehring, who held the position from 1920 to 1922.

Many of Nebraska's athletic directors simultaneously coached one of the university's varsity programs. These included basketball, baseball, and swimming, but the majority of dual-role administrators were football coaches: Stewart, Fred Dawson, Dana X. Bible, Biff Jones, Glenn Presnell, Adolph J. Lewandowski, George Clark, and Bob Devaney. NU's longest-serving athletic director was Devaney, who led the department from 1967 to 1992. Trev Alberts was appointed Nebraska's fifteenth full-time athletic director on July 14, 2021.

Facilities

Nebraska Athletic Hall of Fame
The University of Nebraska Athletic Hall of Fame was established in 2015, located just northeast of Memorial Stadium. Twenty-two former student-athletes were honored in the inaugural class. At least one student-athlete from each of Nebraska's varsity sports has been inducted into the Hall of Fame. Football is the most-represented sport with twelve student-athletes and coaches inducted.

Olympians

A total of 111 athletes from NU have combined to compete in 163 Olympic Games. Nebraska athletes have won fifty-four medals, including sixteen gold medals, while representing thirty countries. Merlene Ottey is Nebraska's most decorated Olympian, winning nine medals and competing in seven Olympic Games, a record for track and field competitors.

Mascots

Before settling on the now-familiar Herbie Husker, and later Lil' Red, Nebraska cycled through several official mascots. The first of these was Corncob Man, a man in green overalls with an ear of corn for a head. After just a few years, the university sought a more "representative" mascot and debuted Huskie the Husker, a farmer who stood ten feet tall and wore overalls with a straw hat on top of a fiberglass head. Huskie soon gave way to Mr. Big Red (more commonly known as Harry Husker); Harry was equally tall but dressed in a blazer and red wide-brim hat. Harry's head was so large it couldn't fit on the team's traveling bus, and it was so heavy the student wearing the costume had to be switched every forty-five minutes.

The physical demands of the Harry costume meant the university was soon looking for another mascot design, and in 1974 NU acquired the rights to Herbie Husker based on the design of Lubbock, Texas artist Dirk West. NU hired Disney cartoonist Bob Johnson to refine West's design into a costume, and Herbie made his first appearance at a Nebraska football game at the 1974 Cotton Bowl Classic, a 19–3 Cornhuskers victory over Texas. Mr. Big Red wasn't officially retired until 1988, but was infrequently seen while coexisting with Herbie.

Historically, Herbie had blond hair and dressed in denim overalls (with an ear of corn in the pocket), a white undershirt, and a red cowboy hat. Prior to the 2003 season, Herbie's appearance was altered to include a red workshirt, blue jeans, and workboots in an effort to update the overall appearance of the state's agricultural workers and general public; however, the new design was not well-received.

Since 1994, Herbie has often been joined on the sideline by the inflatable Lil' Red. Initially, Lil' Red was created to appeal to younger fans and to primarily represent the school's volleyball team, which occasionally played at the same time as Nebraska's football team. Lil' Red was so popular that then-athletic director Bill Byrne considered discontinuing Herbie entirely, but later decided the mascots would coexist. The mascots are now frequently seen together across all sports.

Herbie was named the 2005 National Mascot of the year at halftime of the 2006 Capital One Bowl. Lil' Red won the NCA National Mascot Competition in 1999 and was inducted into the Mascot Hall of Fame in 2007.

In 2022, the university modified Herbie's left hand in the mascot's logo to avoid association with a perceived hate symbol.

Fan support

Decades of high attendance and well-traveling crowds across all sports have earned Nebraska fans a reputation for being fiercely loyal and dedicated. The school's athletic department proclaimed their fans "the greatest fans in college football" in an inscription above each of the twenty-four gates at Memorial Stadium. In 2001, President George W. Bush stated that he "can't go without saying how impressed I am by the Nebraska fan base. Whether it be for women's volleyball or football, there's nothing like the Big Red."

Memorial Stadium is sometimes referred to as The Sea of Red due to the home crowd's propensity to wear the color. Nebraska has sold out every home football game since November 3, 1962, 382 in a row, the longest sellout streak in college athletics. Cornhuskers fans are noted for often applauding the visiting team as they leave the field at the end of the game. Nebraska fans are regarded as some of the best-traveling fans in the country. The most notorious example of this occurred in 2000 when an estimated 35,000 fans wore red at Notre Dame Stadium as No. 1 Nebraska beat No. 25 Notre Dame in overtime.

Nebraska's volleyball program has sold out 285 consecutive matches between the Nebraska Coliseum and Devaney Center, the longest streak of its kind in women's college sports. The Cornhuskers have led the country in attendance for eight straight seasons, and have played in nine of the ten highest-attended college volleyball matches ever played. Nebraska's five-set loss to Wisconsin in the 2021 national championship match broke college volleyball records for both attendance and viewership.

Academic success

Nebraska has produced 347 Academic All-Americans, more than any other Division I school and second only to the Massachusetts Institute of Technology among all universities. Nebraska's 108 Academic All-Americans in football is forty-one more than second-place Penn State; the school also leads all volleyball programs in Academic All-Americans with thirty-eight.

Notes

References

External links